Stephen Smith is a Fijian rugby league footballer who represented Fiji in the 2000 World Cup.

He played club football for the Te Atatu Roosters in the Auckland Rugby League competition.

References

Living people
Fijian rugby league players
Fiji national rugby league team players
Rugby league five-eighths
Rugby league halfbacks
Te Atatu Roosters players
Year of birth missing (living people)